West Buffalo Hill or Wong Ngau Shan is a 604-metre-high (1982-ft) hill within Ma On Shan Country Park, New Territories, Hong Kong. It lies directly west of Buffalo Hill, thus receiving its name. Stage 4 of the MacLehose Trail passes through the hill.

See also
 List of mountains, peaks and hills in Hong Kong
 Buffalo Hill

References

Mountains, peaks and hills of Hong Kong
Sha Tin District